Goat Mountain is a  mountain summit located in Kings Canyon National Park, in Fresno County of northern California, United States. It is situated on Monarch Divide which is west of the crest of the Sierra Nevada mountain range. This feature was so named because mountain sheep, erroneously called goats, were once seen on the slopes. The name was already in use when the first ascent of the summit was made in 1896 by Joseph Nisbet LeConte and party. This mountain's name has been officially adopted by the United States Board on Geographic Names.

Climate
According to the Köppen climate classification system, Goat Mountain is located in an alpine climate zone. Most weather fronts originate in the Pacific Ocean, and travel east toward the Sierra Nevada mountains. As fronts approach, they are forced upward by the peaks, causing them to drop their moisture in the form of rain or snowfall onto the range (orographic lift). Precipitation runoff from this mountain drains into tributaries of the South Fork Kings River.

See also

 List of mountain peaks of California

References

External links
 Weather forecast: National Weather Service

Mountains of Fresno County, California
North American 3000 m summits
Mountains of Northern California
Sierra Nevada (United States)
Mountains of Kings Canyon National Park